Spinster homolog 2 (Drosophila) is a protein that in humans is encoded by the SPNS2 gene.

Model organisms 

				
Model organisms have been used in the study of SPNS2 function. A conditional knockout mouse line, called Spns2tm1a(KOMP)Wtsi was generated as part of the International Knockout Mouse Consortium program — a high-throughput mutagenesis project to generate and distribute animal models of disease to interested scientists.

Animals underwent a standardized phenotypic screen to determine the effects of deletion. Twenty eight tests were carried out on homozygous mutant mice of both sex and nine significant abnormalities were observed, including an absence of pinna reflex, abnormal eye pigmentation and morphology including cataracts, decreased leukocyte cell number, abnormal brainstem auditory evoked potential, increased bone mineral content and a range of atypical peripheral blood lymphocyte parameters. Males additionally displayed decreased circulating glucose and increased circulating bilirubin levels.

The orthologous protein in zebrafish has been shown to transport sphingosine-1-phosphate (S1P) out of cells during vascular development, and human SPNS2 can transport S1P analogues, including the immunomodulating drug FTY720-P.

References 
 

Human proteins
Genes mutated in mice